Colin Tyrer is an English former professional rugby league footballer who played as a goal-kicking  for Leigh, Wigan, Barrow and Hull Kingston Rovers, and also made three representative appearances for Lancashire.

Playing career

Challenge Cup Final appearances
Tyrer played in Wigan's 2-7 defeat by Castleford in the 1970 Challenge Cup Final during the 1969–70 season at Wembley Stadium, London on Saturday 9 May 1970. Tyrer kicked a penalty early in the game, but was forced to leave the game following a collision with Castleford  Keith Hepworth, leaving Tyrer with a broken jaw.  He was replaced by Cliff Hill, and was the first ever player to be substituted in a Challenge Cup final.

County Cup Final appearances
Colin Tyrer played , i.e. number 2, and scored a 2-goals in Leigh's 4-15 defeat by St. Helens in the 1963 Lancashire County Cup Final during the 1963–64 season at Knowsley Road, St. Helens on Saturday 26 October 1963, and played , and scored a 3-goals in Wigan's 15-8 victory over Widnes in the 1971 Lancashire County Cup Final during the 1971–72 season at Knowsley Road, St. Helens on Saturday 28 August 1971.

BBC2 Floodlit Trophy Final appearances
Colin Tyrer played , and scored a 2-goals in Wigan's 7-4 victory over St. Helens in the 1968 BBC2 Floodlit Trophy Final during the 1968–69 season at Central Park, Wigan on Tuesday 17 December 1968.

Genealogical information
Colin Tyrer is the father of the rugby league footballer who played in the 1980s and 1990s for Wigan, Oldham and Whitehaven; Sean/Shaun Tyrer, and the rugby league footballer; Christian Tyrer.

References

External links
Statistics at wigan.rlfans.com

Living people
Barrow Raiders players
English rugby league coaches
English rugby league players
Hull Kingston Rovers players
Lancashire rugby league team players
Leigh Leopards players
Rugby league fullbacks
Rugby league players from Leigh, Greater Manchester
Widnes Vikings coaches
Wigan Warriors players
Year of birth missing (living people)